Russia–Uruguay relations are the bilateral foreign relations between Russia and Uruguay.

Cooperation

Russia is looking for cooperation with Uruguay in the field of nuclear energy, the Russian ambassador to Latin America said: "Our countries could maintain cooperation in the sphere of nuclear energy although Uruguay's legislation bans the use of nuclear energy". The diplomat said Uruguayan officials had shown interest in a floating nuclear power plant, when the project's presentation took place at the Russian Embassy recently. The first floating plant will have capacity of 70 MW of electricity, and about 300 MW of thermal power. The cost of the first plant is estimated at $400 million, but could later be reduced to $240 million. The year 2009 marked the 150th anniversary of diplomatic relations between Russia and Uruguay.

Resident diplomatic missions
 Russia has an embassy in Montevideo.
 Uruguay has an embassy in Moscow.

See also
Russians in Uruguay

External links

Embassy of the Russian Federation in Montevideo
 С.Н.Кошкин (S.N. Koshkin), "Полтора века дипотношений" ("One and a half centuries of diplomatic relations"), Международная жизнь (Mezhdunarodnaya Zhizn Magazine),  No. 11, 2007

 
Uruguay
Bilateral relations of Uruguay